The Asian Games mascots are fictional characters, usually an animal native to the area or human figures, who represent the cultural heritage of the place where the Asian Games are taking place. The mascots are often used to help market the Asian Games to a younger audience. Every Asian Games since 1982 has its own mascot. Appu, the mascot for the 1982 Asian Games, was the first mascot.

Asian Games mascots

Asian Beach Games mascots

Asian Indoor and Martial Arts Games mascots

Asian Youth Games mascots

References 

Asian Games
Mascots
Lists of mascots